The Marist men's lacrosse team represents Marist College in National Collegiate Athletic Association (NCAA) Division I men's lacrosse. Marist currently competes as a member of the Metro Atlantic Athletic Conference (MAAC).

History

The men's lacrosse team has been to three NCAA Tournaments after winning the MAAC lacrosse titles in 2005, 2015 and 2019. In 2005 they would go on to play eventual national champion Johns Hopkins in the first round. Marist was soundly defeated 22-6. In the 2015 tournament #20 Marist defeated Bryant University 10-6 in an NCAA play in game. However #2 ranked Syracuse had too much talent for the Foxes in the first-round game, winning 20-8. Originating as a club sport during the 1970s, men's lacrosse subsequently became an NCAA Division III varsity sport and by the early 1980s, began transitioning up to Division I. In 1981, the Marist men's lacrosse team captured the Knickerbocker Conference title. Fairfield coach Andy Copelan led Marist to their first NCAA tournament.

Notable athletes and coaches

 Andrew Copelan

Annual record

 (1) Laxpower / LaxBytes / Laxnumbers Power Ratings 
 (2) NCAA Play In
 (3) NCAA First Round
 (4) NCAA First Round

References

External links